Gripin is the self-titled second studio album of Turkish rock band Gripin, released on 26 February 2007 by Sony Music/GRGDN.

Track listing
Böyle Kahpedir Dünya 
Sana Ne Bundan 
Sensiz İstanbul'a Düşmanım (guest vocal: Emre Aydın)
Olduğu Kadar
Sustukların Büyür İçinde
Zor Geliyor (guest vocal: Pamela Spence)
Hiç Gelme Gideceksen
Baba Mesleği (guest vocal: Ferman Akgül)
Zamana Bırakma Bizi
Dört

Album credits
Producer: Haluk Kurosman
Supervising producers: Hadi Elazzi, Selim Serezli
Edit: Haluk Kurosman, Arda İnceoğlu
Mixing assistant: Arda İnceoğlu
Mastering: Çağlar Türkmen
Photo: Fatih Uysal
Design: Volkan Lale

Musicians
Kempa yaylı grubu (Böyle Kahpedir Dünya, Olduğu Kadar, Sensiz İstanbul'a Düşmanım)

Writing credits
Böyle Kahpedir Dünya
Lyrics: S. Birol Namoğlu, Haluk Kurosman
Music: S. Birol Namoğlu, Murat Başdoğan
Sana Ne Bundan 
Lyrics: S. Birol Namoğlu,  Haluk Kurosman
Music: S. Birol Namoğlu, Murat Başdoğan, Haluk Kurosman
Sensiz İstanbul'a Düşmanım (guest vocal: Emre Aydın)
Lyrics: S. Birol Namoğlu, Emre Aydın, Haluk Kurosman
Music: S. Birol Namoğlu, Emre Aydın, Murat Başdoğan
Olduğu Kadar
Lyrics: S. Birol Namoğlu, Haluk Kurosman
Music: S. Birol Namoğlu, Murat Başdoğan
Sustukların Büyür İçinde
Lyrics: Evren Gülçığ, S. Birol Namoğlu, Haluk Kurosman
Music: Arda İnceoğlu, Evren Gülçığ, S. Birol Namoğlu, Haluk Kurosman
Zor Geliyor (guest vocal: Pamela Spence)
Music & Lyrics: Evren Gülçığ, S. Birol Namoğlu
Hiç Gelme Gideceksen
Lyrics: S. Birol Namoğlu, Haluk Kurosman, Murat Başdoğan
Music: S. Birol Namoğlu, Murat Başdoğan
Baba Mesleği (guest vocal: Ferman Akgül)
Music & Lyrics: S. Birol Namoğlu, Murat Başdoğan, Haluk Kurosman  
Zamana Bırakma Bizi
Lyrics: S. Birol Namoğlu, Evren Gülçığ
Music: S. Birol Namoğlu, Arda İnceoğlu
Dört
Music & Lyrics: Evren Gülçığ, S. Birol Namoğlu, Haluk Kurosman

Music videos
Böyle Kahpedir Dünya
 directed by Gürcan Keltek; the video describes how the kahpe dünya (whore world) works in the nightlife of İstanbul
 Sensiz İstanbul'a Düşmanım
 Duet with Emre Aydın
 Dalgalandım da Duruldum 
 The song is not featured in the album; cover song

External links
 Gripin official site 
 Gripin Myspace
 GRGDN official site

2007 albums
Gripin albums
Albums produced by Haluk Kurosman